James Stanley Daly (born 12 January 2000) is an English footballer who plays as a forward for  club Woking.

Early life
Daly was born in Brighton, East Sussex and supports Brighton & Hove Albion. However, upon signing for rivals Crystal Palace, Daly also developed an affinity for the Eagles.

Club career

Crystal Palace
Daly was invited for a trial at Brighton aged 10 or 11, but was rejected. He subsequently joined the academy of rivals Crystal Palace aged 14.

On 7 April 2018, he was named in the first team squad, as a substitute, for an away match against AFC Bournemouth.

In May 2018, he was named as the club's "Scholar of the Year" and in July signed a one-year professional deal with the club.

In August 2018, Daly joined Isthmian League Premier Division side Kingstonian on loan until the end of the 2018–19 season.

In June 2019, Daly signed a contract extension with Crystal Palace.

Daly was included as an unused substitute in three first-team squads over the Christmas period in 2019. In the 2019–20 season Daly regularly played as a defender for the Crystal Palace under-23 side.

Bristol Rovers
On 31 January 2020, Daly joined  side Bristol Rovers on a two-and-a-half year deal. He made his debut for Bristol Rovers as a 71st-minute substitute for Liam Sercombe on 29 February in a  home 0–1 defeat to Shrewsbury Town. On 10 October 2020, Daly scored his first goal for the club, heading home to equalise as Rovers went on to win 2-1 away at Lincoln City.

Stevenage
Daly joined fellow League Two club Stevenage on a free transfer on 2 June 2021.

Woking
On 2 June 2022, Daly agreed to join National League side, Woking on a one-year deal following his release from Stevenage.

Personal life
James has a twin brother, Joel, who is also a footballer and appeared for Whitehawk and Haywards Heath Town. He currently plays for Tiffin Dragons.

Career statistics

References

External links

2000 births
Living people
English footballers
Footballers from Brighton
Association football forwards
Crystal Palace F.C. players
Kingstonian F.C. players
Bristol Rovers F.C. players
Stevenage F.C. players
Woking F.C. players
English Football League players
Isthmian League players
National League (English football) players